Goghtanik is a village in the Yeghegis Municipality of the Vayots Dzor Province in Armenia.

Demographics 
Its population rose to 763 by 1916, but fell to 330 by 1931.

According to Statistical Committee of Armenia, as of 2011, the village has population is 190.

Gallery

References

External links 

 

Populated places in Vayots Dzor Province